Delaunays may refer to:

 Robert Delaunay (1885-1941) and Sonia Delaunay (1885-1979), French artists; husband and wife
 North Manchester General Hospital, formerly Delaunays workhouse, in Manchester, England